Tingena apanthes is a species of moth in the family Oecophoridae. It is endemic to New Zealand and found on the North Island. The adults are on the wing from October to December. It appears associated with Leptospermum species and it has been hypothesised that the appearance of the adults of this species imitates faded Leptospermum leaves.

Taxonomy 

This species was first described by Edward Meyrick in 1883 using specimens collected at Hamilton and Cambridge in January and named Oecophora apanthes. Meyrick gave a more detailed description under this name in 1884. In 1915 Meyrick placed this species within the Borkhausenia genus. In 1926 Alfred Philpott was unable to study the genitalia of the male of this species as a result of no specimens being available in New Zealand collections. George Hudson discussed and illustrated this species under the name B. apanthes in his 1928 publication The butterflies and moths of New Zealand. In 1988 J. S. Dugdale placed this species in the genus Tingena.  He also discussed Hudson's illustration of this species and alleged that it was dubious as Dugdale regarded the illustration as too yellow for T. apanthes. The male lectotype, collected in Cambridge, is held at the Natural History Museum, London.

Description
Meyrick first described this species as follows:

Meyrick described this species in more detail as follows:

Distribution

It is endemic to New Zealand and has been collected in Wellington as well as Hamilton and Cambridge.

Behaviour and habitat 
This species is on the wing from October to May. Hudson commented it was associated with Manuka scrub and that it was likely its appearance imitated faded Manuka leaves.

References

Oecophoridae
Moths of New Zealand
Moths described in 1883
Endemic fauna of New Zealand
Taxa named by Edward Meyrick
Endemic moths of New Zealand